Oldbury-on-the-Hill is a small village and former civil parish in Gloucestershire, England, ninety-three miles west of London and less than  north of the village of Didmarton.

History
Oldbury-on-the-Hill has been inhabited since prehistoric times, and Nan Tow's Tump, a round barrow beside the A46 road, is a Bronze Age earthwork and archaeological site. The tree-grown barrow is about thirty metres in diameter and three metres high. The name refers to Nan Tow, said to have been a local witch who was buried upright in the barrow.

The parishes of Oldbury-on-the-Hill and Didmarton were together surrounded on all sides by the parish of Hawkesbury and the county boundary with Wiltshire, which is taken to suggest that they were anciently part of Hawkesbury.

The Domesday Book of 1086 calls the village Aldeberie. Before 1066, it was held by Eadric, Sheriff of Wiltshire, and in 1086 by Ernulf de Hesdin.  A document of 972 gives the name as Ealdanbyri, meaning 'old fortification'. A possible derivation from the name of St Arilda has also been suggested.

In 1342, the tithe of hay and other lesser tithes in Didmarton and Oldbury-on-the-Hill belonging to Badminton church were assessed at £4 13s. 4d.

Together with neighbouring Didmarton, the parish was subject to enclosure in 1829.

Benjamin Clarke's British Gazetteer (1852) says: 

According to The National Gazetteer of Great Britain and Ireland (1868):

On 25 March 1883, Oldbury-on-the-Hill was incorporated into the civil parish of Didmarton, the two having shared a Rector since 1735.

Parish records
Parish registers for Oldbury-on-the-Hill survive from as early as 1568, and all surviving records for the period 1568 to 1978 are deposited at the Gloucester Record Office.

Monumental inscriptions from St Arilda's churchyard include the names Alcock, Baker, Bayliss, Chappell, Clark, Cockram, Dale, Fry, Gunter, Hatherell, Hatherle, Holborow, Holobrow, Long, Pirtt, Rice, Thompson, Toghill, Verrinder, Walker, Watts, Webb, White, and Yorke.

Parish church

The earliest record so far found of a church at Oldbury-on-the-Hill occurs in 1273, when there is a mention of a ‘free chapel’ there. In 1291, the Rector of Great Badminton had a portion of 8s. and 6d. in the chapel of Oldbury. The oldest part of the present medieval parish church of Oldbury is estimated to date from the 14th century.

St Arilda was a Gloucestershire virgin and martyr who lived at an uncertain time before the Norman conquest of England at Kington, near Thornbury, which is now in the parish of Oldbury-on-Severn. Her feast day is 20 July.

St Arilda's at Oldbury-on-the-Hill has been declared redundant, so is no longer used for regular worship.

Notes

External links

Oldbury-on-the-Hill at genuki.org.uk
DIDMARTON, LASBOROUGH, LEIGHTERTON, BOXWELL, OLDBURY-on-the-HILL & SADDLEWOOD page at rootsweb.ancestry.com, with photograph of St Arilda's Church, Oldbury-on-the-Hill
Photograph of St Arilda's Church, Oldbury-on-the-Hill at wishful-thinking.org.uk
Oldbury-on-the-Hill location map from google.co.uk/maps
Oldbury-on-the-Hill at geodaisy.com (includes current weather report and weather forecast for next ten days)
Gloucestershire census returns 1801-1901 at genuki.org.uk

Villages in Gloucestershire
Cotswold District